The Upminster Tithe Barn Museum of Nostalgia is a small museum located in Upminster in the London Borough of Havering, London, England. It is located at OS grid reference TQ564877.

It is owned by Havering London Borough Council and run in partnership with the Hornchurch and District Historical Society. The museum holds around 14,500 artifacts of domestic and agricultural use. , it is open at selected weekends only from 10:30 a.m. to 4:30 p.m. from April to October. 

The museum opened in 1976. The thatched barn in which the museum is located was built in 1450 by the nearby priory (dependent on  Waltham Abbey).  Although commonly known as the Tithe Barn, the building was never used for the collection of tithes and a grange barn might be a more accurate designation (Upminster's real tithe barn adjoined the rectory in what is now Gridiron Place). Upminster station is the nearest National Rail and London Underground station. The Upminster Tithe Barn Museum is served by London Buses route 248.

Gallery

See also
 Tithe barn

External links
 Official website
 London 21 — Listing

Buildings and structures completed in 1450
Barns in England
Museums established in 1976
1976 establishments in England
Folk museums in the United Kingdom
Rural history museums in England
Museums in the London Borough of Havering
Thatched buildings in England
Tithe barns in Europe